Oleh Oleksandrovych Makarov (July 26, 1929 – November 8, 1995) was a Ukrainian and Soviet football player, coach, and sports writer.

Honours
 Soviet Top League winner: 1961.
 Soviet Cup winner: 1954.

International career
Makarov played his only game for the USSR on July 27, 1957, in a 1958 FIFA World Cup qualifier against Finland.

In 1956 Makarov played couple of games for the Ukraine at the Spartakiad of the Peoples of the USSR.

Bibliography
 Makarov, O. Vratar (Goalie). "Radyanskyi pysmenyk". Kyiv, 1963.

References

External links
  Profile

1929 births
1995 deaths
People from Rubtsovsk
Soviet footballers
Soviet Union international footballers
Soviet Top League players
FC Chornomorets Odesa players
FC Dynamo Kyiv players
Soviet football managers
FC Dynamo-2 Kyiv managers
FC Nyva Vinnytsia managers
FC Avanhard Ternopil managers
Honoured Masters of Sport of the USSR
Merited Coaches of Ukraine
Soviet sportswriters
Russian sportswriters
Association football goalkeepers